Benedictine University is a private Roman Catholic university in Lisle, Illinois. It was founded in 1887 as St. Procopius College by the Benedictine monks of St. Procopius Abbey in the Pilsen community on the West Side of Chicago. The institution has retained a close relationship with the Benedictine Order, which bears the name of St. Benedict (480–543 A.D.), the acknowledged father of western monasticism.

The university resides in the western Chicago metropolitan area, located near two national research facilities, Argonne National Laboratory and Fermi National Accelerator Laboratory. The university's location along the East-West Tollway corridor provides internship and employment opportunities for students. Benedictine University also has a branch campus in Mesa, Arizona.

History
Benedictine University, also called BenU, was founded in 1887 as St. Procopius College by the Benedictine monks of St. Procopius Abbey, who lived in the Pilsen community of Chicago's West Side. The monks created the all-male institution just two years after their community began, with the intention of educating men of Czech and Slovak descent. While the school was called a college from its founding, it did not begin offering post-secondary courses until after it moved from Chicago to rural Lisle in 1901. It became fully accredited in 1957 and, as the area around it transitioned from rural to suburban, it grew substantially. Also in 1957, the institution's high school component began operating independently of the college and is now called Benet Academy. The college became fully coeducational in 1968.

The school changed its name to Illinois Benedictine College in 1971, and in 1996, it became Benedictine University. While the institution continued to grow in Lisle, it expanded its reach to include campuses in other cities, including Springfield, Illinois, in 2003 and Mesa, Arizona, in 2012.  The university added the Kindlon Hall of Learning and the Birck Hall of Science in 2001 and the Neff Alumni Center in 2012, and in 2015, Benedictine opened the Daniel L. Goodwin Hall of Business, which features the Trading Lab and a 600-seat auditorium.

After recognizing that there is great demand for American business programs overseas, Benedictine joined forces with Shenyang University of Technology and Shenyang Jianzhu University in China to bring Master of Business Administration and Master of Science in Management Information Systems programs there.

Presidents
 Rev. Daniel Kucera, O.S.B. – a Benedictine who later became Archbishop of Dubuque, 1959–1965, 1971–1976.
 Richard C. Becker, Ph.D., 1976–1995
 William J. Carroll, Ph.D., 1995–2015
 Michael S. Brophy, Ph.D., 2015–2018
 Charles Gregory 2018–present

Academics
Benedictine University offers 59 undergraduate majors through The College of Science, The College of Liberal Arts, The Daniel L. Goodwin College of Business, and The College of Education and Health Services. It also offers 19 graduate programs, 34 graduate certificates, and 4 doctoral programs.

Rankings
Forbes magazine named Benedictine among "America’s Top Colleges" for the ninth consecutive year in 2019 (ranked #566 in Top Colleges, #362 in Private Colleges, and #222 in Research Universities)..  Benedictine did not make the Forbes list in 2020.

U.S. News & World Report listed Benedictine among its best colleges in 2019 (ranked #221 [tie] in National Universities).

Lisle campus

Benedictine University moved to Lisle, Illinois, in the far western suburbs of Chicago and DuPage County, in 1901. After the dedication of Benedictine Hall, new buildings were added throughout the early 1900s. Although it had admitted women from time to time, the college became fully coeducational in 1968. In 1971, it changed its name to Illinois Benedictine College. In response to community needs, graduate, doctorate and adult learner programs were added. In 1996, the college was renamed Benedictine University. The Birck Hall of Science and the Kindlon Hall of Learning were built in 2001. The Village of Lisle-Benedictine University Sports Complex, a unique cooperative venture between a governmental body and private university, was dedicated in 2005. Renovation of the Dan and Ada Rice Center was completed in October 2011.

The rapid growth of the Daniel L. Goodwin College of Business created the need for construction of the Daniel L. Goodwin Hall of Business – the largest classroom building on campus at 125,000 square feet – which houses the college's undergraduate and graduate business programs and doctoral programs in Organization Development and Values-Driven Leadership. The building also features classrooms, study areas, seminar rooms, offices, a 600-seat auditorium to facilitate lectures, a 40-seat real-time trading lab that provides hands-on investing experience, a 7,500-square-foot main hall and a café.

The Lisle campus' additionally features the Jurica-Suchy Nature Museum, a small natural history museum located on the second floor of the Birck Hall of Science. The museum represents the work of Frs. Edmund and Hilary Jurica, O.S.B., who collected specimens for their students to use during their almost 100 combined years of teaching at Benedictine University, and Fr. Theodore Suchy, O.S.B. (d. 2012), who served as museum curator for more than 30 years. The museum has continued to collect specimens since the Juricas' deaths in the early 1970s and now has a collection numbering more than 10,000 specimens ranging from small invertebrates to a rorqual skeleton. The Jurica-Suchy Nature Museum is open to the public as well as to school groups.

Benedictine's Lisle campus has 2,885 undergraduate students of which 44 percent are male and 56 percent are female, and the student body represents 50 states and territories, and 15 countries. Approximately one-third of the students are minority.

Benedictine University at Mesa
Benedictine University Mesa, located in Mesa, Arizona, became the first four-year Catholic university in Arizona when classes began in 2013. It is a remote campus of Benedictine University in Lisle, IL. Undergraduate majors include accounting, communication arts, computer science, criminal justice, fine arts, graphic arts and design, management and organizational behavior, nutrition, political science, psychology, theology and Spanish.  As of 2019, the Mesa campus had 568 students, and 76 faculty and staff.

The university also provides degree-completion programs and graduate degrees.

Its athletic teams are known as the Redhawks and compete in the National Association of Intercollegiate Athletics as a member of the California Pacific Conference. Student athletes compete in men's and women's cross country, golf, basketball, soccer, baseball and softball, and volleyball, including women's beach volleyball.

In 2019, Mesa established a partnership with Co+Hoots, a private co-working business based in Phoenix, Arizona, to explore innovative educational opportunities, which includes establishment of a "certificate program in entrepreneurship".  The partnership, which fits into the city's plan to create a "downtown innovation district", included renovation and expansion of Mesa's downtown campus facility at 225 E. Main Street to include space which would be provided "rent-free" to Co+Hoots as a commercial co-working space.  Benedictine leases this downtown facility from the city, a lease which ends in 2038, with an option to purchase beginning in 2033.

Former Springfield branch campus
The Springfield branch campus of Benedictine University was founded in 1929 as a separate institution known as Springfield Junior College. The college changed its name in 1967 to Springfield College in Illinois. In early 2003, Springfield College in Illinois and Benedictine University formed a partnership through which Benedictine offered bachelor's, master's and doctoral degrees in Springfield. This partnership resulted in a merger between the two institutions, following Illinois Board of Higher Education guidelines and those of the U.S. Department of Education. In 2010, Benedictine University established a branch campus named Benedictine University at Springfield. Springfield College in Illinois ceased all academic programs in August 2011. In fall 2014, the Benedictine University Board of Trustees decided that the Springfield campus would end undergraduate education and transition to adult-oriented academic programs. Adult programs are now offered through the university's School of Graduate, Adult and Professional Education.

On February 27, 2018, The Benedictine University Board of Trustees and the Board of Springfield College in Illinois announced that the Springfield property at 1500 N. 5th St. would be offered for sale. As of the end of the 2018 spring semester, courses were no longer offered at the Springfield branch campus. Starting with summer 2018 courses, the adult degree-completion and graduate students formerly at the Springfield branch campus attended Benedictine University at employer and community sites in the Springfield area. The Springfield branch campus property was in need of capital improvements. The decision to move to other area sites provided the university's students and faculty with more accessible, comfortable and equipped-for-teaching locations.

Benedictine in Asia
More than 1,000 students have graduated with a Master of Business Administration (M.B.A.) or Master of Science in Management Information Systems (M.S.M.I.S.) from Benedictine University through its partnerships with two Chinese universities – Shenyang University of Technology (SUT) and Shenyang Jianzu University (SJZU) – formed in the early 2000s. In 2009, Benedictine partnered with two universities in Vietnam—the Vietnam National University (VNU) in Hanoi and Binh Dong University in Ho Chi Minh City (formerly Saigon)—to offer graduate programs in business administration and management information systems. In 2012, Benedictine received approval from the Ministry of Education in China to offer a Master of Public Health (M.P.H.) through a partnership with Dalian Medical University.

Athletics

Lisle Eagles
The athletic teams at the Lisle campus are called the Eagles. The campus is a member at the NCAA Division III ranks, primarily competing in the Northern Athletics Collegiate Conference (NACC) since the 2006–07 academic year. The Eagles previously competed in the defunct Northern Illinois-Iowa Conference (NIIC) until after the 2005–06 school year.

Benedictine–Lisle competes in 19 intercollegiate athletic programs: Men's sports include baseball, basketball, cross country, football, golf, lacrosse, soccer, track & field and volleyball, while women's sports include basketball, cross country, golf, lacrosse, soccer, softball, track & field and volleyball.

Mesa Redhawks
The athletic teams at the Mesa campus are called the Redhawks. The campus is a member of the National Association of Intercollegiate Athletics (NAIA), primarily competing in the California Pacific Conference (Cal Pac) since the 2015–16 academic year.

Benedictines–Mesa competes in 15 intercollegiate athletic programs: Men's sports include baseball, basketball, golf, soccer and volleyball, while women's sports include basketball, beach volleyball, golf, soccer, softball and volleyball. Club sports include badminton, bowling, eSports and spirit squad.

The men's and women's golf, cross country, volleyball and tennis teams played their first season at the club level in the 2014–15 school year.

Springfield Bulldogs
The athletic teams at the Springfield campus were called the Bulldogs. The campus was a member of the National Association of Intercollegiate Athletics (NAIA), primarily competing the American Midwest Conference from 2011–12 to 2014–15 (when the campus dropped its athletics program).

Benedictine–Springfield competed in 14 intercollegiate athletic programs: Men's sports included baseball, basketball, cross country, distance track, golf and soccer; while women's sports included basketball, cross country, distance track, golf, soccer, softball and volleyball; and co-ed sports included cheerleading.

Intramurals
Both campuses also offer intramurals, group fitness classes and club sports. Benedictine students play men's tennis, men's lacrosse, ping pong, spirit squad, eSports, bowling and badminton as club sports.

Center for Values-Driven Leadership
The Center for Values-Driven Leadership is a scholar-practitioner center located in the Goodwin College of Business at Benedictine University. Founded in 2008, the center (also known as the CVDL), was established to help leaders improve their companies and make significant contributions to business and society through their lives and work. James D. Ludema, Ph.D., professor of Organization Development; and Sandra Gill, Ph.D., former dean of the Goodwin College of Business, are co-founders. The center's doctoral program in values-driven leadership offers a Ph.D. or D.B.A. (Doctor of Business Administration) degree in a format designed for senior executives.  The center has partnered with the Center for Positive Organizations at the University of Michigan and with the Small Giants Community to create the Return on Values research initiative. This initiative explores the link between culture and profit in small and mid-size businesses.

References

External links
 Official website
 Benedictine–Lisle Eagles athletics website
 Benedictine–Mesa Redhawks athletics website
 Benedictine–Springfield Bulldogs athletics website 

 
Association of Catholic Colleges and Universities
Benedictine colleges and universities
Educational institutions established in 1887
Lisle, Illinois
Roman Catholic Diocese of Joliet in Illinois
Universities and colleges in DuPage County, Illinois
1887 establishments in Illinois
Catholic universities and colleges in Illinois